Nkiruka 'Kiki' Omeili  (born May 31, 1986) is a Nigerian actress, best known for her role as Lovette in the TV series Lekki Wives. She is also known for her role as Blessing in the 2015 crime caper, Gbomo Gbomo Express alongside Gideon Okeke.

Early life
Omeili was born in Lagos, and is the second of four children of Charles and Maureen Omeili. She is ethnic Igbo from Nimo in Anambra State. Her Father Charles was a banker with First Bank Nigeria and retired as a general manager, while her mother Maureen was the Controller of Prisons in Ibadan, Oyo State, Nigeria. Omeili began performing in stage plays all through her primary and secondary school years. This continued when she got into the university as she was a member of the drama club and acted in various productions as well as taking part in several drama competitions. In 2006, she obtained a Medical degree from the College of Medicine, University of Lagos.

Career
In 2011, Omeili auditioned for and got the role of Debbie in the TV series Behind the Smile. In 2012, she teamed up with the director of Behind the Smile, Tunde Olaoye, to star in her debut feature film Married but living single where she worked with Funke Akindele, Joseph Benjamin, Femi Brainard and Joke Silva. Omeili has had roles in a number of TV series including The Valley Between, NESREA Watch, Lekki Wives and Gidi Culture.

Asides from her acting roles, in 2011 Omeili hosted the Dance reality TV show Dance 234, a Koga entertainment production.

In August 2013, it was announced that Lekki Wives would be renewed for a second season, and Omeili's contract was renewed to reprise her role as Lovette.

Early 2016, she starred in the Nigerian Box Office hit Couple of Days, where her portrayal of the character Joke, got wonderful reviews from critics. In May 2016, "Iterum" a short film directed by Stanlee Ohikhuare and starring Omeili and Paul Utomi was premiered at the 69th Annual Cannes Film Festival.

On May 31, 2016, Omeili made her debut as a movie producer, with the release of the Short Film "Unprotected". The film is based on true events, which she observed as a medical student in the university. The film features Omeili, as the lead character, and Eric Didie, Bimbo Ademoye, Blessing Ambrose and Nathan Kingsley in supporting roles.

In June 2018, Omeili began production of her debut full-length feature film, Run, which was directed by Uche Chukwu. The movie Run was released in cinemas on August 23, 2019 starring comedian Owen Gee, Rotimi Salami, Kelechi Udegbe, and Greg Ojefua. It was also selected to screen at the Silicon Valley International Film Festival in California and the Slum International Film Festival in Kenya and received an award at the Toronto International Nollywood Film Festival in Canada.

In February 2023, Omeili was unveiled as one of the new cast members on MTV Shuga.

Awards and recognition
In October 2012, Omeili received the award for the Best Actress (Supporting Role in an English language film) at the 17th African Film Awards in London.

In May 2014, Omeili was listed among the Top 25 New Faces of Nollywood by Nigerian Entertainment Today. She had also been listed by Nigerian newspaper The Sun as one of Nollywood's fastest rising stars earlier in 2014.

Omeili was nominated for the TV Actress of the Year at the ELOY Awards in November 2014. She was nominated for her lead role in the Television series Lekki Wives.

In October 2015, Omeili won the award for the Best Supporting Actress for her role in the Movie Sting, at the 2015 Golden Icons Academy Movie Awards which held in the USA.

In July 2016, Omeili won the award for Best Supporting Actress of the Year at the 2016 City People Entertainment Awards in Lagos, Nigeria.

In October 2016, Omeili was nominated for Best Lead Actress in a Short Film at the 2016 Berlin International Film Festival for her role in the film, Deluded.

Omeili, was unveiled as a Festival Ambassador at the 2017 Realtime film festival in recognition of her contribution to the Nigerian film industry.

In 2018, Omeili won the best supporting actress award at the World Music & Independent Film Festival, which held in the Caribbean Islands for her role in the movie 3Some. In the same year, she was also nominated for Best Actress at the Realtime film festival.

Humanitarian work
Omeili has been involved in humanitarian work with Project Pink Blue. She led their cancer awareness walk, helping the cancer nonprofit raise funds and awareness through social media and events.

Filmography

See also 

 List of Nigerian actors

References

Living people
Actresses from Lagos
University of Lagos alumni
Nigerian television actresses
Nigerian stage actresses
Nigerian film actresses
21st-century Nigerian medical doctors
Nigerian women medical doctors
21st-century Nigerian actresses
Igbo actresses
1986 births
Actresses from Anambra State
Nigerian television presenters
Nigerian film producers